"Raise a Little Hell" is a song by Canadian rock band Trooper. It was released in July 1978 as the lead single from their fourth studio album Thick as Thieves. It is the band's only US Hot 100 hit and is regularly played in sports stadiums across Canada and the United States. In 2012, the song received a SOCAN Classic Award in recognition of 100,000 radio plays.

Film and television
The song appeared in the television series Call Me Fitz and Stranger Things; and the films Gutterball (2008), Drive Angry (2011) and Bandit (2022).

Legacy
"Raise a Little Hell" has become both a staple of classic rock radio stations around the world and a popular sports anthem in Canada and the United States, most notably at National Hockey League and Major League Baseball games. Rolling Stone placed the song at #7 on their list of the "Top 10 Sports Anthems of All Time", while CKKQ-FM "the Q" ranked the song at #10 on their list of "The 150 Best Canadian Songs".

During the Ottawa Senators' time at TD Place Arena, from 1992 to 1996, they used Raise a Little Hell as their goal song, and continued to use it when they moved to the Palladium (now the Canadian Tire Centre) until the 2000s.

The song is briefly used in the first season of Stranger Things.

Other versions
The song is covered by Canadian punk band GrimSkunk and appears on Fubar: The Album which the soundtrack to the film "FUBAR".

The song is covered by the band Head East and appears on their 2013 album Raise a Little Hell.

Charts

References

1978 songs
1978 singles
Canadian hard rock songs